Within classical European music, the Song and Trio form is often referred as Compound Ternary form. This is where one of the Ternary form sections can be subdivided into two subsections such as: I-II-I or A-B1-B2-A.

Examples 
 Haydn's Piano Sonata in C Major, Movement III 
 Beethoven Sonata Op.2 No.1, Movement III
 Beethoven Sonata Op.14 No.9, Movement II
 Leroy Anderson Fiddle Faddle

External links 
 Youtube Fiddle Faddle

Song forms